

Geography 

Kondhawali is located at 17°57'50"N 73°46'2"E around 33 km from --Wai
in Satara District.  It is surrounded by the mountainous region of the Sahyādris.  It is considered as one of the popular location for shooting film, as it is surrounded by water of dhom dam from another side and Hills of Kamalgad forth from another side.  Kondhawali is situated on the krishna river.

Demography 
According to 2001 census in India, Kondhawali then had a population of 700-800.  As of 2001, 11% of the population was under 6 years of age.

History 
Kondhawali is birthplace of Jiva Mahale (bodyguard of Shivaji) who saved Shivaji from Afzal Khan at the Battle of Pratapgad.

Temples
There are five major temples in the village
Shree Bhairavanaath Temple
Hanuman Temple
Shree Datta Mandir
Siddheshwar Mandir
Gorakshanath Mandir

Special highlights
Kamalgad
Krishna River
Ram krishna hari ashram

Gallery

Villages in Satara district